Karilopatna (Karilo patna, Karilo patana, is a village near Patkura in Kendrapara district in the Indian state of Odisha.

Geography
Karilopatna is located at Kendrapara. It is surrounded by Bhadrak, Jajpur, Cuttack and Jagatsinghpur districts and Bay of Bengal in the east.

The river Karandia (a branch of Luna) and Chitrotpala (a branch of Mahanadi) is flowing outside of Karilopatna Panchayat.

Culture
The Baladevjew Temple is located in Kendrapara. A car festival or Rath Yatra is held in the month of Ashadha (June/July) every year. The Gajalaxmi puja on Kojaagari Purnima or Kumar Purnima is celebrated in the month of October and Kartikeya Puja in November and Maa Kali Puja at Olaver are held each year. Gajalaxmi puja is a big festival here and is celebrated for 7 days. Maa Kali Puja in Olaver is one of the famous festivals in the region. The Odia sweet dish, Rasabali, originated from Kendrapara. The car of Lord Baladevjew, also called as 'Bramha Taaladhwaja' is one of the biggest cars of its type in the world. Kendrapara is also known as Tulasi Ksherta (as Tulasi, different from basil tulsi is the wife of Lord Balabhadra) and Gupta Kshetra (Lord Balabhadra wish to stay here secretly). Different types of prasad prepared and used in Baladevjew Temple are Rasabali, Potali Pitha, Magaja Ladoo, Kakaraa, Khaja, Karanji, Chhena Kheeri, Ghanabrata, Dahipakhala, Khiri, Puri etc.

Village Kusupur is one of the well known and very important village in the District Kendrapara - Cuttack (erst while) District. Village Poet Nanda Kishore Bal, Village Educationist and socialist leader Surya Mani Jena, Silpiguru Bimbadhara Verma, Pradyumna Bal, Member of Parliament are the most distinguished personalities who hails from village Kusupur. Village Kusupur is also famous for its Dussera Sabha which organizes the traditional Sword Fighting on the eleventh day (next day of Dussera) for last more than hundred years. On this occasion Kusupur Dussera sabha organises various local cultural functions including the sword fighting wherein the Kshetriyas of village Kusupur and from the nearest gadjat areas participate and were being awarded. Apart from the sword fighting the fire fighting are also worth watching. Every year about a lakh of people gathered in Kusupur to witness the Dussera Sabha. Village Kusupur is situated in the bank of river Birupa and next to Balichandrapur on the National Highway No. 5A. Bhalukuni Melana is celebrated each and every year in Derabis hata ground. It is one of the biggest melana in the district. Ramjan, Eid, Bakhrid, Muharram are the festivals of Muslims are observed each year with great pump. Derabish is located 11 km away from district headquarters.
Karilopatna located near to Kendrapara is a beautiful place to visit. Potali Matha, located at Balia which is around 5 km towards north of Kendrapara town, organizes a 5-day 'Biswa Santhi yajna' each year in March. People from across India gather there. On the final day of the Yajna, organized by the local trust headed by Kartik chandra Mishra and there is always a big crowd, more than 20,000 to get the prasad (Yajna Ahuti).
Lohit baba Mandir, located at Chhata Chhaka (NH-5A), Derabish is around 6 km away from Kendrapara town and 20 km away from chandikhol. Dadhibamana Temple is situated in Derabish.
One of the famous "Boita Bandana Utashv" held on November (Kartika masa) in the village kalapada, which is 7 km from Kendrapara town situated in the bank of Luna river (A part of Mahanadi). Near about 20-30 thousand people gather in this festival that will celebrate for 7 days. And the ultimate part is, it is inaugurated by Power Minister Mr. Atanu Saibyasachi. That festival is mainly celebrated for the remembrance of Sadhabs who were gone to Java and Sumitra etc. for business.

Most of the people here are farmers and some do business and some do fishing in the river and the bay of Bengal. Growing prawn near sea shore is also a profitable business. Many small-scale industries are coming up so people are now getting more opportunity there.

Landmarks
Batighar is the first lighthouse installed in eastern coast of India. It is situated on the other bank of river Kharinasi. The height of this light house is 125 feet. Construction of this lighthouse was started on 6 December 1836 and it was lighted on 16 October 1837.

Kanika Palace is a massive palace constructed by King of Kanika. It was constructed on an area of 4 acres of land and height of the structure is of 75 feet. It is situated in Rajkanika Block.

Aul Palace is situated near Aul township. It is an ancient palace spread over 40 acres of land.

Badakotha is an old building near the Kendrapara Bus stand. Once upon a time, Badakotha in Odisha only indicated to the 2 stair building of Radhashyam Narendra.

Hukitola is a storm proof go-down constructed in the Jamboo island by British according to the wish of Captain Harris. It consists of 11 large size and 9 small size chambers.

Environment
Bhitara Kanika is covered with deep mangrove forest and saline rivers. It was declared as Sanctuary from 21-04-1975. It is famous for natural crocodile breeding. Other animals like deer, Wild boar, monkeys, Monitor, Python, King Cobra also found here.

There are so many picnic spots in and around Kendrapara. Paradeep is only 20–30 km drive from Kendrapara. You can see the sea beach, port, Nehru Bangala (first prime minister of India had come here) and also see the entry gate of river to sea shore. Paradeep is also the last point of east coast of India.

Religion
Most popular Udaya Giri & Ratna Giri just 10–15 km drive from Kendrapada. Mainly Budhu Murti, Budhu pratima are conserved there. There also a picnic spot Named Sakhi Bata. It is situated near Luna River.it is a beautiful spot. Lord Baladev and Laxmi Mandir is there.
 Maa Gojabayani Temple, Baghadia
 Baraha Jew Temple, Aul
 Binodbehari Jewish temple, Ganamahal
 Sakhibata Temple, Bagada
 DadhiBaman Jewish Temple, Choudakulat
 Sakhibata Temple, Bagada
 Gobinda Jewish Temple, Kendrapara

Politics
The Assembly seats under the Kendrapara parliamentary constituency are Kendrapara, Salepur, Mahanga, Mahakalapada, Ali, Patakura and Rajnagar. The major three prominent political parties in the Assembly and Parliamentary constituency of Kendrapara are Bharatiya Janata Party, Biju Janata Dal and Congress Party. Mr. Prasanta Varma, Advocate Supreme Court of India and the President of BJP Legal Cell, Delhi; The Industrialist Mr. Baijayant Panda of the Biju Janata Dal; Former Cricketer and the Manager of India national cricket team Mr. Ranjib Biswal of the Congress Party are the current leaders of Kendrapara Parliamentary constituency.

Throughout the area politics have remained with the local parties since the 1970s. Kendrapara has played a crucial role in Odisha's politics, producing leaders like Member of Parliament Mr. Rabi Ray who achieved the post of Speaker in Loksabha, and Mr. Biju Patnaik, former Chief Minister of Odisha. Present day leaders from Kendrapara include individuals such as Supreme Court of India Lawyer, Mr. Sanjib Kumar Mohanty, Advocate and Former Spokesperson of Delhi University Students' Union and Mr. Prasanta Varma, as well as Member of Parliament of Kendrapara (Lok Sabha constituency), Mr. Baijayanta Panda. Current Member of Parliament is Baijayant PandaHe has done nothing for Karilopatna as well for Kendrapara. Mr Kedarnath Samantray is also a good politician from karilopatna village. He was unable to win any election in his entire life even as ward member but still he is hopping to stand in panchayat election this time. He nominated his wife for Jila parisad candidate for Kendrapara district this year (2012). Let us hope the same result as earlier.
Now Kendrapara is expecting a new leader Mr. Biswajeet Samantaray S/O Kedarnath Samantaray, He is a politician by profession. He is expected to be a Mile stone in Odisha's Politics.
Current MLA from Kendrapara Assembly Constituency is Sipra Mallik, who won the seat in State elections of 2004. Previous MLAs from this seat were Utkal Keshari Parida of OGP, Bed Prakash Agarwalla who won this seat in 2000 representing BJP and also earlier in 1990 representing JD and in 1977 representing JNP, Bhagabat Prasad Mohanty of INC who won in 1995 and in 1985, and Indramani Rout of INC (I) in 1980.

Presently Mr. Pratap Keshari Deb is the MLA of Ali; Mr. Pratap Jena is the MLA of Mahanga; Mr. Atanu Sabyasachi is the MLA of Mahakalapada; Mr. Bed Prakash Agarwala is the MLA of Patkura 

Now kendrapara is expecting a new leader Mr. Pruthibi Prakash swain S/O Mr. Purusottam swain(Ex leader of Karilopatana). Mr. Pruthibi Prakash swain is an automobile engineer by profession but a social activist by passion. He is expected to be the next big personality in Indian Politics.

Kendrapara is part of Kendrapara (Lok Sabha constituency).

Transport
Kendrapara is just about 75 kilometres from the state capital, Bhubaneswar. To reach Kendrapara one can go via Cuttack-Jagatpur-Salipur state high way or on the National Highway No.5 and 5 A, crossing at ChandikholViaChhata towards Paradip. Kendrapara is just two and half hour drive from Bhubaneswar Airport on the National Highway 5 and 5 A.(If you go non-stop by your car). The Nearest Railway station is at Cuttack which is 55 kilometre from Kendrapara town.

Demography

 2001 census, "Karilo patana" had a population of 2,697 in 625 households. The municipality had a sex ratio of 1000 females per 1,000 males. Kendrapara has an average literacy rate of 77.33%, higher than the national average of 59.5%: male literacy is 87.62%, and female literacy is 67.29%. In Kendrapara, 12% of the population is under 6 years of age. The local language is Odia, the state language, but a high degree of fluency is also present in Hindi, English, as well as some familiarity with Urdu in some parts of the population.

Hindus form the dominant majority of the population. There is a substantial Muslim minority.

Education
In the field of education also Kendrapara is not behind. There are so many schools and colleges which are engaged in creating well qualified professionals in all the fields. Some of the educational institutions of Kendrapara are:

Derabish High School, Derabis
Kansar Sahaspur High School, Kansar Sahaspur
Ramachandra High School, Fakirabad
Chhatabata girls High school, Hafimelak
Baldevjew High School
Balia Women's College
Kendrapara Law College
Maruti Ucha Bidyapitha, Baghilo
Panchayat High School, Laxminarayan Pur
Balia Government High School
Chandol College
Kendrapara Institute of Engineering & Technology (KIET) 06727-221003
Jagulaipara Deshpur Girls High School
Balia High School
Derabish College
PNS Diploma college
NM Industrial Training Center, Balia, Bhagatpur. Miss Mitali Madhusmita Pradhan Member of Managing Committee
Bhagabanpur High School
Kendrapara College 
Naindipur High School by Amar Das
Bharati Bidya Mandir
Marsaghai College
Karilopatna college, Karilopatna
Dohali High School
Tulsi Women's College
Government Girl's High School
Lokanath Mohavidyalaya, Korua
Gulnagar High School
Ichhapur High School
Kalapada High School
Ideal Public School
Unique Public School, Derabis
Jawahar Navodaya Vidyalaya, Baro
Joyaram High School Karilopatna
Kendrapara Boys High School
Naindipur High School, Naindipur
Marsaghai High School
Netaji Subhash English Medium School
Rajagarh High school
Saraswati Sisu Vidya Mandir
Pradhan Patikira M.E. School Written By Pradyumna Kumar Rout (DIPU)
Unique Public School, Derabis
St. Joseph School
Standard Public School
Sudersan High School, Thakurhat
Kudanagari High School, Kudanagari
Balabehari Bidyapitha, Mahal
Sidha Marichiyani Bidyaptha, Manatir
Kuanarpal UP School (B) Kuanarpal, Marshaghi, Kendrapara
Harekrushna High School, Damarpur, Pattamundai
Pattamundai College, Pattamundai
S.N. College, Rajkanika
M.N. High School, Pattamundai

Community

Mission for Allied Social Service (MASS), Derabish, Burhan Khan (president) Abdul Raheman Khan (SECY), Naim Akhter (Treasurer) Derabis
 Sahara Educational And Welfare Trust. Chairman (Burhan Khan)

References

Cities and towns in Kendrapara district